Slow children at play is a common sign seen in American cities urging motorists to slow down. The signs are seen around areas where children frequent, such as playgrounds and schools. They are almost always characterized by the words "Slow Children At Play" and a picture of a child running. They sometimes have a "suggested limit" posted on them. This rate is not a regulated or legal limit but rather a suggested rate that one may want to use if children are present. A regulated speed sign is always white with black lettering and the words "Speed Limit" are on the sign. This sign is yellow and is considered an "Advisory" or caution sign.

In a form of exploitative, lowbrow comedy, the signs quite often provide fodder for humor at the expense of mentally disabled children.

Some municipalities will not post "Children at Play" signs.  The website of Montgomery County, Maryland Department of Transportation states: 
"Children at Play" signs are not approved for use by the "Manual on Uniform Traffic Control Devices", the national standard for traffic control signs. The generic message of these signs does not command sufficient motorists attention since motorists are generally aware of the increased possibility of children playing in adjacent yards and sidewalks when they are driving on any residential street.

"Children at Play" signs are inappropriate for public streets since they convey the suggestion that playing on the street is acceptable behavior, which it is not. Additionally, the installation of this sign may lead parents and children to believe they have an added degree of protection which these sign do not provide.

References

Road signs in the United States